The Delhi–Kolkata high-speed rail corridor is one of the route of the proposed high-speed rail in India. The line is part of the Diamond Quadrilateral Program, which seeks to unite the cities of New Delhi, Kolkata, Mumbai and Chennai via high speed rail. This travels along the Delhi–Howrah main line from Tundla to Howrah.

A second phase of the project has been already taken up to extend the corridor to the Howrah Terminus (Howrah Railway Station) in the metropolitan city of Kolkata.

Currently, the international consortium INECO-TYPSA-ICT is carrying out the feasibility study.

Status Update 
Delhi-Varanasi Corridor (Phase I)
October 2020: Feasibility report submitted to Ministry of Railways
December 2020: NHSRCL to conduct ground survey using LiDAR technique
January 2021: NHSRCL starts LiDAR survey

References

External links 
 Delhi-Agra, Lucknow-Patna bullet trains soon?
 City may get high speed train

Transport in Delhi
Rail transport in Howrah
High-speed railway lines in India
Rail transport in Uttar Pradesh
Rail transport in Bihar
Rail transport in West Bengal
Rail transport in Delhi
Standard gauge railways in India